is a Japanese voice actress best known for Wake Up, Girls!, where she played the central character. She is affiliated with 81 Produce.

Career
Growing up in Osaka, Yoshioka studied stage acting in school. She became aware of Mamoru Miyano and was inspired by his work as both a stage actor and seiyuu. She passed an audition for Wake Up, Girls! in her second year of high school.

She and her fellow W.U.G. actresses won the Special Award at the 9th Annual Seiyu Awards.

Select works

Television
 2006
 Kyō no Go no Ni

 2014
 Wake Up, Girls!
 DRAMAtical Murder
 Hacka Doll the Animation

 2016
 Anne Happy
 Hundred
 Taboo Tattoo

 2017
 Love Tyrant
 The Laughing Salesman NEW
 In Another World with My Smartphone
 100% Pascal-sensei

 2018
 Release the Spyce
 Hinomaru Sumo

 2019
 Fruits Basket
 Cop Craft

 2020
 Breakers
 Sakura Wars the Animation
 Ahiru no Sora

Games
 2013
 Wake Up, Girls! Stage no Tenshi

 2014
 Tokyo 7th Sisters

 2015
 Miracle Girls Festival

 2016
 Gurumon
 Soul Reverse Zero

 2018
 Grimms Notes Repage
 Onsen Musume Yunohana Collection

 2019
 New Sakura Wars

 2020
 Arknights
 Kirara Fantasia
 22/7 Music Time
 Project Sekai

References

External links 
 Official agency profile 
 IMDB Page

1995 births
Living people
Japanese voice actresses
81 Produce voice actors